The Seventh Legislative Assembly of Delhi was constituted on 16 February 2020 after the 2020 Delhi Legislative Assembly elections were concluded earlier on 8 February 2020 and the results were announced on 11 February 2020. It is the legislative arm of the  Government of Delhi.

History

Election and government formation
  
Elections for 70 assembly seats in Delhi were concluded on 8 February 2020 and results were announced on 11 February 2020. The Aam Aadmi Party emerged as a single largest party by winning 62 out of 70 seats with a landslide victory.

The Third Kejriwal ministry was sworn into office after election.

In August 2022 a floor majority test was scheduled in the assembly. Delhi Chief Minister conducted a floor test in the Delhi Assembly to prove that the AAP government enjoyed the majority and BJP's Operation Lotus had failed to poach AAP MLAs.

Office bearers

Committees

Members of Legislative Assembly

Budget
On 26 March 2022, a budget of 75 thousand 800 crore rupees was presented in the Delhi Assembly by the Finance minister Manish Sisodia. AAP leaders expected that the budget would create employment for 20 lakh people in Delhi, in the upcoming five years.

Composition Of House Committees (2022–2023) 

Delhi Legislative Assembly National Capital Territory Of Delhi Composition Of House Committees

Financial committees

House committees

Department Related Standing Committees 
I Standing Committee on Administrative Matters

(Administrative Reforms; Services; Vigilance; Dte. Of Training (UTCS);
Delhi Subordinate Services Selection Board; General Administration Department;
Law, Justice & Legislative Affairs; Information Technology)

II Standing Committee on Education : (Education; Higher Education; Training & Technical Education; Art, Culture and Language; Sports)

III Standing Committee on Welfare : (Social Welfare; Labour; Food And Supplies; Employment; Home )

IV Standing Committee on Health : (Medical and Public Health; Family Welfare; Directorate of Health Services; Food Safety)

V Standing Committee on Development : (Development; Rural Development; Urban Development; Agricultural Marketing; Revenue; Land and Building; Industries )

VI Standing Committee on Public Utilities and Civic Amenities : (Public Works Department; Power; Delhi Jal Board; Irrigation and Flood Control)

VII Standing Committee on Finance and Transport :(Finance; Trade And Taxes; Excise & Luxury Taxes; Planning; Transport; Tourism; Departments not allotted to other Committees)

References

Delhi Legislative Assembly
Delhi